The Documentary is the second studio album by American rapper The Game. It was released on January 18, 2005, by Aftermath Entertainment, G-Unit Records, and Interscope Records. In 2001, while the Game was in a hospital recovering from a shooting, he decided to pursue a career in music. He released the mixtape, "Q.B. 2 Compton" under his then record label "Get Low Recordz" in 2002, which was later discovered by Dr. Dre and led to him signing the Game to his label, Aftermath Entertainment. The album includes production from high-profile producers such as Dr. Dre, Kanye West, Scott Storch and Timbaland, among others, and guest appearances from 50 Cent, Eminem, Nate Dogg and Faith Evans, among others. This would be the Game's only album on Aftermath and G-Unit Records, as he left the label later in 2006 after a feud began between him and fellow G-Unit label-mate 50 Cent.

The Documentary debuted at number one on the US Billboard 200, selling 586,000 units in its first week. In March 2005, the Recording Industry Association of America certified the album double Platinum, and by November 2005 the album sold 2.5 million copies in the U.S. The Documentary received generally positive reviews, with critics praising the album's production. It is also often debated by critics between itself and  Doctor's Advocate as Game's best album.
Since the album's release, the Game was credited as a "driving force" in reviving the once-dominant West Coast hip hop scene that had since been overshadowed by artists from the East, Midwest and South during the early 2000s. The Documentary remains the Game's best-selling album to date. On June 16, 2014, the Game announced a sequel to the album, The Documentary 2, which was released on October 9, 2015, followed by the release of The Documentary 2.5 a week later.

Recording
After the Game signed with G-Unit, he recorded nine songs with fellow American rapper 50 Cent in his home studio in Farmington, Connecticut, and then went back to Los Angeles, California to complete the album with American record producer Dr. Dre. While continuing the recording sessions on the album, he began working with rapper and record producer Kanye West on a song, where Kanye did the chorus. However, the song was left on the cutting room floor. The Game was also inspired to revive the hip hop scene in the West Coast, which had been overshadowed since its heyday in the 1990s by rappers from the East and the South. In 2005, in the interview with Vibe magazine, 50 Cent stated that he was brought in by the Interscope Records to work on the album, claiming that was on the verge of being shelved and the Game was being dropped from the label. However, in the interview with Funkmaster Flex, the Game said that his status was never uncertain that he would be dropped from the label. 50 Cent also wrote 6 choruses of The Documentarys eighteen tracks—"Hate It or Love It", "How We Do", "Church for Thugs", "Special", "Higher", and "Westside Story"—and didn't receive proper credit for his work.

Music

Lyrics
The Game for the album recorded tracks based on his life experiences from his childhood to his success as a rapper. When asked about the album, he stated:  The rapper commented on the album's perception before its release, saying, "I know everybody was expecting gang-bang, 40-ounce, low-rider music, but that's not what I gave them... I'm telling a real story, and maybe there are people out there who can relate to my experiences." Rolling Stone observed that "every song has a well-massaged hook and some immediate appeal, and verses that don't waste a lot of time getting to the point."

Production
The Documentarys big budget production from high-profile hip hop producers was well received from critics. The first half of the album contains "upbeat, gangsta boogie" tracks with the other half relegating "smoothed out R&B maneuvers". At seven tracks, Dr. Dre co-executive produced the album with his "stripped-down cinematic" approach. "Westside Story" contains an "evil sounding piano plink", "Dreams" has a "simultaneously smooth and eerie" beat, and "Hate It or Love It" unveils a "smoothed out R&B funk vibe". "Higher" revolves around a pounding synth blast and "How We Do" contains syncopated hand claps with a beat described as "a hypnotic blast of sinister seduction powered by a deliciously primitive 808 pattern and a slinky synth." "Don't Need Your Love" samples Mary J. Blige's "Not Gon Cry" and is one of the album's more soulful songs. "Church for Thugs" delivers a "sing-song stylee over an accentuated sonic bed" and "Put You on the Game" is a club track containing "dark dirge[s] of synth".

Although "Start from Scratch" features R&B singer Marsha Ambrosius, the beat "eschews the traditional R&B vibes" for more "aural intimidation". IGN called it "the most haunting inclusion on the album." "The Documentary" features a "busy backing track" of "crashing symphonics and tinny flares of synth", which one critic believed overshadowed the lyrics. "Runnin is a "dark, Stygian tune augmented by tinges of R&B mellowness." "No More Fun and Games" has a fast-paced beat that takes inspiration from early 1990s production. "We Ain't", which samples Dr. Dre's "The Watcher", takes Eminem's "chug laden synth gurgle" and is described as "one of the most menacingly catchy numbers on the entire album." Nate Dogg features on two "smoothed out" tracks; "Special" and the G-funk-inspired "Where I'm From". "Don't Worry" is an R&B flavored track and despite its "minimal production", one reviewer wrote the song "still hits hard." The final track, "Like Father, Like Son", is driven by a "melodramatic, string-laden" beat. Originally, Brandy Norwood was supposed to be on "Don't Worry", but Jimmy Iovine did not want a gangsta rapper like the Game on a song with Brandy.

Title
The album's title was initially called "Nigga Witta Attitude Vol. 1" (a reference to N.W.A), but was changed to "The Documentary" because legal issues with an injunction filed at the request of Eazy-E's widow Tomica Woods-Wright prevented him from using N.W.A's name in the album title.

Release and promotion

The album was initially meant to be released in October 2004; however, since the other high-profile albums—including Eminem's Encore—were to be released around the same time, it was pushed back to January 18, 2005. On September 28, 2004, the Game released a promotional mixtape entitled Westside Story through Aftermath Entertainment and G-Unit Records. The mixtape was used to promote his major-label debut album, The Documentary. In October 2004, the Game released his first independent album, titled Untold Story, through Get Low Recordz (owned by JT the Bigga Figga). The album sold over 82,000 copies within its first three months. The album featured artists such as Sean T, Young Noble (of the Outlawz) and JT the Bigga Figga. The Game also appeared on various mixtapes, which has been hosted by DJ's such as DJ Kayslay, DJ Whoo Kid and DJ Clue?. The Game also released a second mixtape You Know What It Is Vol. 2 through his own record label and appeared on the video game NBA Live 2004 on a song produced by Fredwreck called "Can't Stop Me". On November 15, 2004, the Game released a promotional mixtape, titled Charge It to the Game: The Mixtape, through Westside Records. The tape was also used to promote The Documentary.

Singles
"Westside Story" was the first official single to be released from The Documentary. The song features guest vocals from American rapper 50 Cent, while the production was handled by Dr. Dre and Scott Storch. The single entered on the US Billboard Hot 100 at number 93, charted at number 55 on the Hot R&B/Hip-Hop Songs, and at number 29 on the Rhythmic Top 40 charts. Rolling Stone described it as "a kind of L.A. version of "In Da Club" with "a simple keyboard part, a spare 808 beat and strings that manage to sound both stressed-out and catchy." The Game has stated that this song is a tribute to Tupac Shakur, with a direct reference to him, saying "I got California love fuckin bitches to that Pac shit." The Game also makes references to Tupac's songs "California Love" and "Against All Odds". Other references includes, Nate Dogg, Tha Dogg Pound (D.P.G.) and their song "New York", Westside Connection, Michael Jackson with his album Thriller, DJ Pooh, and Kool G Rap. There is a remix featuring Snoop Dogg singing the hook and a version with both Snoop Dogg and 50 Cent on it.

"How We Do" was the second official single to be released from The Documentary. The song features guest vocals from American rapper 50 Cent, while the production was handled by Dr. Dre and Mike Elizondo. The single entered on the US Billboard Hot 100 at number four, and stayed for over four weeks. The single also charted at number two on the Hot R&B/Hip-Hop Songs, at number two on the Hot Rap Tracks, at number one on the Rhythmic Top 40, at number three on the Hot Digital Songs, at number 38 on the Latin Tropical Airplay, at number 11 on the Pop 100, at number 14 on the Pop 100 Airplay, at number 14 on the Top 40 Mainstream, and at number 16 on the Top 40 Tracks charts. The single attained respectable international charting. In the United Kingdom the single entered on the UK Singles Chart at number five, in Germany the single entered on the German Singles Chart at number nine, in the Republic of Ireland the single entered on the Irish Singles Chart at number eight, and in Australia the single entered on the Australian Singles Chart at number 18. The single was an instant hit with major air play. It was also moderately successful worldwide, reaching the top twenty in most countries. The music video was directed by Hype Williams". The Recording Industry Association of America certified the single Gold.

"Hate It or Love It" was the third official single to be released from The Documentary. The song features guest vocals from American rapper 50 Cent, while the production was handled by Cool & Dre. The single was the most popular single from the album. The single entered on the US Billboard Hot 100 at number two, charted at number one on the Hot R&B/Hip-Hop Songs, at number one on the Hot Rap Tracks, at number six on the Hot Digital Songs, at number 39 on the Latin Tropical Airplay, at number nine on the Pop 100, at number 13 on the Pop 100 Airplay, at number one on the Rhythmic Top 40, and at number 16 on the Top 40 Mainstream charts. The single attained respectable international charting. In the United Kingdom the single entered on the UK Singles Chart at number four, in Germany the single entered on the German Singles Chart at number 14, in the Republic of Ireland the single entered on the Irish Singles Chart at number five, in Australia the single entered on the Australian Singles Chart at number 23, and in Denmark the single entered the Danish Singles Chart at number 17. The track uses a sample from the song "Rubber Band" performed by the Trammps. At the 2006 Grammy Awards, it was nominated for Best Rap Performance by a Duo or Group and Best Rap Song. The music video, which was directed by the Saline Project, was nominated at the 2005 MTV Video Music Awards for Best Rap Video, but lost to Ludacris' "Number One Spot". The Recording Industry Association of America certified the single Gold.

"Dreams" was the fourth official single to be released from The Documentary. The single entered on the US Billboard Hot 100 at number 32, charted at number 12 on the Hot R&B/Hip-Hop Songs, at number five on the Hot Rap Tracks, at number 74 on the Hot Digital Songs, at number 62 on the Pop 100, and at number 13 on the Rhythmic Top 40. The single attained international charting. In the United Kingdom the single entered on the UK Singles Chart at number eight, in Germany the single entered on the German Singles Chart at number 71, in the Republic of Ireland the single entered on the Irish Singles Chart at number 11, and in Australia the single entered on the Australian Singles Chart at number 42. The song was produced by Kanye West. The track features a sample of "No Money Down" performed by Jerry Butler. Co-Written by Jimmy "Henchmen" Rosemonds' artist, "Beloved". The song was dedicated to Yetunde Price who was shot dead in 2003. One critic wrote the Game "sews together a soulful Martin Luther King Jr. type speech with the acerbic wit and hustler charm of Malcolm X." Phillip Atwell directed the music video. The song is also known for having an incorrect lyric in 'I woke up from that coma 2001, about the same time Dre dropped 2001'. This references the Dr. Dre album 2001, actually released in 1999. The song was placed 16th on about.com's Best Hip-Hop Songs of 2005. And had singer Mýa Harrison in the music video.

"Put You on the Game" was the fifth and final official single from The Documentary. The single was the lowest charting single from the album, reaching only at 96 on the Hot R&B/Hip-Hop Singles & Tracks. The single attained respectable international charting. In the United Kingdom the single entered on the UK Singles Chart at number 46, and in the Republic of Ireland the single entered on the Irish Singles Chart at number 22. The single was produced by Timbaland and co-produced by Danja. This was the first single released by the Game after his truce with 50 Cent fell apart and after the Game released You Know What It Is Vol. 3. It was recently that a lawsuit has been filed from a Major India Record Company Saregama India, Timbaland, co-producer Nate "Danja" Hills, the Game, Interscope Records, along with a few other Production companies are being sued for using an uncleared sample from artist. The music video features the Game with many appearances by his current and former Black Wall Street affiliates. The video shows various places in Los Angeles County; including downtown Los Angeles and Compton. The music video showed these landmarks down at Los Angeles such as Staples Center, the Watts Towers, and LAX. The Game refers to a number of artists, songs and albums in "Put You on the Game"; including The Chronic, N.W.A, Makaveli, the Notorious B.I.G., Public Enemy, Flavor Flav, G-Unit, 50 Cent, Dr. Dre and his song "Let Me Ride", Eve, and Snoop Dogg. During the DVD Stop Snitchin, Stop Lyin,the Game watches the video for this song pausing at specific spots in the video which shows a dead man on the ground blocked off by police tape. The Game then repeatedly states that he is wearing G-Unit sneakers, a diss at 50 Cent saying his career is dead. Damon Johnson directed the music video. Entertainment Weekly called it a "club track so crunkalicious, it's almost shocking that a California newbie — not a Ludacris — was the recipient of its deep-fried Southern charms." The song was placed 44th on about.com's Best Hip-Hop Songs of 2005.

Critical reception

The Documentary received generally positive reviews. On Metacritic, The Documentary received an aggregate score of 72 out of 100 based on 19 reviews. Pitchfork Media called it "the best West Coast street-rap album since DJ Quik's 2002 LP Under tha Influence" and described the production as "a rich, triumphant sonic tapestry". Allmusic wrote the album was an "excellent debut" that "hints at a lot of potential" and observed the "most remarkable aspect of the Game is how he can be such a blatant product of gangsta rap... and leave a mark so fast." Rolling Stone noted the Game was "going for emotional impact rather than dazzling wordplay or laughs" and PopMatters described him as "a self-conscious, malicious, nihilistic gangsta rapper with a heart and lyrical content". On the other hand, Robert Christgau believed the album was "dull even when he isn't describing his medical problems, this no-talent is masscult rock at its most brazen". The A.V. Club praised the production for being "a sonic classic of slow-rolling G-funk and glossy hyper-soul", but panned the Game for his name dropping, suggesting if he "cut all the references to rappers and albums... it'd be a good 15 to 20 minutes shorter—and probably a lot more compelling." Billboard declared it "one of the best rap albums of the year" and Entertainment Weekly suggested "with the brightest hip-hop stars aligning for him, the Game may have willed himself a popular masterpiece."

IGN criticized the large number of guest appearances, stating "the propensity of guest artists makes it hard to actually get a grasp on the rising star's own voice." MusicOMH observed "like many rap albums The Documentary is too long, but it maintains a high level of interest" and overall, it was "an impressive effort" that "introduces a strong presence to the West Coast". Stylus Magazine wrote "no one disappoints" and despite the record being "so obviously and deeply grounded in marketing, it’s still an outstandingly solid and enjoyable" debut. The New York Times noted the Game's "tough but straightforward rhyme style is appealing but not, usually, enthralling... This is a rapper who almost never forgets himself, who almost never loses himself in syllables just for the fun of it." The Village Voice criticized the rapper's lyrical skills, saying, "the Game's rhymes are about six degrees from totally artless". Yahoo! Music also panned the lyrics for "almost totally lacking in shock value, humour or insight", but praised the production, writing that "musically, this is probably the greatest major label hip-hop album of recent years – a near faultless succession of hi-tech beats and ominously catchy hooks".

Accolades
The album appeared on numerous music critics' and publications' end-of-year albums lists. Pitchfork Media placed the album at number 35 on their list of Top 50 Albums of 2005. At the 48th Annual Grammy Awards, the Game was nominated with a total of two nominations, including Best Rap Song and Best Rap Performance by a Duo or Group for the smash single "Hate It or Love It". In 2012 Complex named the album one of the classic albums of the last decade.

Commercial performance
The Game is often credited as a driving force in bringing the West Coast hip hop scene back to recognition. Before its release, he expressed his desire to have high opening week sales, saying, "I want to sell a million albums in my first week. And if I only sell one album the following week, I'm good." He also admitted feeling nervous about not being able to live up to the industry expectations, saying, "Yeah, I've got some butterflies. I'm worried about my first-week numbers, and I'm worried about living up to the hype." The album debuted at number one on the US Billboard 200 chart, selling 586,000 copies in the first week. The Recording Industry Association of America certified the album double Platinum on March 23, 2005, and it was the tenth best-selling record of the year. As of March 2005, the album has sold over 2.5 million units in the United States.

The Documentary peaked at the top fifteen in most European charts it entered. It peaked at number seven on the UK Albums Chart and remained on the chart for thirty-three weeks. It reached the top ten in the Netherlands, France, Ireland, Switzerland, and the top twenty in Belgium, Germany, and Norway. The album topped the Canadian Albums Chart for three weeks and on March 8, 2005, it was certified Platinum with 100,000 units shipped. It has since sold over five million copies worldwide.

Track listing

Notes
 signifies an additional producer.
 signifies a co-producer.

Sample credits
Information taken from The Documentary liner notes.
 "Intro" contains a sample of "Down into the Magic" performed by Hanson.
 "Dreams" contains a sample of "No Money Down" performed by Jerry Butler.
 "Hate It or Love It" contains a sample of "Rubberband" performed by The Trammps.
 "Don't Need Your Love"contains a sample of "Not Gon Cry" performed by Mary J. Blige.
 "Put You on the Game" contains a sample of "Baghon Mein Bahar Hai" performed by Mohammed Rafi and Lata Mangeshkar from the soundtrack to Aradhana.
 "The Documentary" contains an audio excerpt from the 2003's film Livin' tha Life.
 "No More Fun and Games" contains a sample of "Gangsta, Gangsta" performed by N.W.A.
 "We Ain't" contains a sample of "The Watcher" performed by Dr. Dre and Eminem, "One Day at a Time" performed by Tupac Shakur, Eminem, and the Outlawz, and "Patiently Waiting" performed by 50 Cent and Eminem.
 "Where I'm From" contains a sample of "Amanda" performed by Dionne Warwick.
 "Special" contains a sample of "Catherine Howard" performed by Rick Wakeman.
 "Like Father, Like Son" contains a sample of "Mariya" performed by The Family Circle.

Personnel
Credits for The Documentary adapted from Allmusic.

 50 Cent – executive producer, writer, vocals
 Marcella "Ms. Lago" Araica – assistant engineer
 Mark Batson – producer
 Steve Baughman – engineer
 Jeff Bhasker – musician, producer
 Jose Borges – assistant engineer
 David Brown – assistant engineer
 Buckwild – producer
 Tony Campana – engineer
 Demacio Castellon – engineer
 Mark Catson – keyboards
 Larry Chatman – production coordination
 Kevin "KD" Davis – engineer
 DJ Hi-Tek – engineer, producer
 Michael Dobmeier – assistant engineer
 Dr. Dre – executive producer, mixing, producer
 Jimmy Douglas – mixing 
 Mike Elizondo – bass, keyboards, musician
 Eminem – mixing, producer, vocals
 Focus... – musician, producer
 Scott Gutierrez – assistant engineer
 Robert Hannon – engineer
 Havoc – producer
 Nathaniel "Danjahandz" Hills – producer
 Keenan "Kee Note" Holloway – bass
 Lionel "LJ" Holwan – keyboards
 Ken Huffnagle – engineer
 Mauricio "Veto" Irragorri – engineer, mixing
 Glenn Jefferies – guitar
 D. Diana Jenkins – vocals
 Just Blaze – producer
 Rouble Kapoor – assistant engineer
 Wayne Kee – guitar
 Steven King – bass, engineer, guitar, mixing
 Mike Lynn – A&R
 Jonathan Mannion – photography
 Natasha Mathis – vocals
 Kyla Miller – engineer
 Needlz – producer
 Ervin Pope – keyboards
 Oscar "Filtrate" Ramierez – engineer
 Jeff Reed – engineer, producer
 Luis Resto – keyboards, producer
 Angelo Sanders – A&R
 Jason Schweitzer – engineer
 Ed Scratch – engineer
 Justin Smith – mixing
 Scott Storch – musician, producer
 Tank – scratching
 Jayceon Taylor – writer
 Timbaland – mixing, producer, vocals
 Che Vicious – producer
 Joe Warlick – engineer
 Kanye West – producer
 Ryan West – engineer, mixing

Charts

Weekly charts

Year-end charts

Certifications

References

External links
 The Documentary at Discogs
 The Documentary at Metacritic

2005 debut albums
The Game (rapper) albums
Albums produced by Buckwild
Albums produced by Cool & Dre
Albums produced by Focus...
Albums produced by Eminem
Albums produced by Havoc (musician)
Albums produced by Hi-Tek
Albums produced by Danja (record producer)
Albums produced by Dr. Dre
Albums produced by Jeff Bhasker
Albums produced by Just Blaze
Albums produced by Kanye West
Albums produced by Mark Batson
Albums produced by Mike Elizondo
Albums produced by Scott Storch
Albums produced by Timbaland
Aftermath Entertainment albums
G-Unit Records albums
Interscope Records albums